Roger A. Nutt is an American engineer and politician. He is a member of the South Carolina House of Representatives from the 34th District, serving since 2020. He is a member of the Republican Party.

In 2023, Nutt was one of 21 Republican co-sponsors of the South Carolina Prenatal Equal Protection Act of 2023, which would make women who had abortions eligible for the death penalty.

References

Living people
Republican Party members of the South Carolina House of Representatives
21st-century American politicians
Tennessee Technological University alumni
People from Johnson City, Tennessee
Engineers from South Carolina
1965 births